The Legislature XIV of Italy started on 30 May 2001 and ended on 27 April 2006. Its composition resulted from the general election of 13 May 2001. The election was called by President Ciampi, after he dissolved the houses of Parliament on 8 March 2001. The legislature ended after its natural course of five years, soon after the houses were dissolved again by Ciampi on 11 February 2006.

The election leading to the composition of this legislature was characterized by the use of decoy lists ("liste civetta") by both major coalitions (the House of Freedoms and the Olive Tree), in order to "de facto" turn the additional member system implemented by the electoral law into a parallel voting system. In the case of the House of Freedoms, this tactic was so effective that Forza Italia did not have enough candidates for the seats that had won, missing out on 12 seats.

Government

Composition

Chamber of Deputies

The number of elected deputies was 613. Although the total number of seats was of 630, at the start of the legislation it was not possible to assign the remaining 17 seats (distributed between the House of Freedoms and The Daisy) because of missing candidates in the electoral lists. Some of these seats were assigned later during the legislature.

 President: Pier Ferdinando Casini (UDC), elected on 31 May 2001
 Vice Presidents: Alfredo Biondi (FI), Publio Fiori (Mixed), Fabio Mussi (DS – L'Ulivo), Clemente Mastella (Mixed – UDEUR)

Senate

The number of elected senators was 315. At the beginning of the legislature there were nine life senators (Giovanni Leone, Francesco Cossiga and Oscar Luigi Scalfaro as former Presidents, and the nominated life senators Carlo Bo, Norberto Bobbio, Gianni Agnelli, Giulio Andreotti, Francesco De Martino and Paolo Emilio Taviani). After the death of Leone, Bo, Bobbio, Agnelli, De Martino and Taviani, and the nomination of the new life senators Rita Levi-Montalcini, Emilio Colombo, Mario Luzi (who died in February 2005), Giorgio Napolitano and Sergio Pininfarina, the total number of senators at the end of the legislature was of 320.

 President: Marcello Pera (FI), elected on 30 May 2001
 Vice Presidents: Roberto Calderoli (LN) until 20 July 2004, Domenico Fisichella (AN, then Mixed), Cesare Salvi (DS – L'Ulivo), Lamberto Dini (The Daisy), Francesco Moro (LN) from 29 September 2004

References

Legislatures of Italy